were magistrates or municipal administrators with responsibility for governing and maintaining order in the shogunal city of Edo. Machi-bugyō were samurai officials of the Tokugawa shogunate in Edo period Japan.  Appointments to this prominent office were usually hatamoto, this was amongst the senior administrative posts open to those who were not daimyōs. Conventional interpretations have construed these Japanese titles as "commissioner", "overseer" or "governor."

During the Edo period, there were generally two hatamoto serving simultaneously as Edo machi-bugyō.  There were two Edo machi-bugyō-sho within the jurisdictional limits of metropolitan Edo; and during the years from 1702 though 1719, there was also a third appointed machi-bugyō.

The Edo machi-bugyō were the central public authorities in this significant urban center.  These men were bakufu-appointed officials fulfilling a unique role.  They were an amalgam of chief of police, judge, and mayor.  The machi-bugyō were expected to manage a full range of administrative and judicial responsibilities.

Each machi-bugyō was involved in tax collection, policing, and firefighting; and at the same time, each played a number of judicial roles—hearing and deciding both ordinary civil cases and criminal cases.

In this period, the machi-bugyō were considered equal in status to the minor daimyōs.  At any one time, there were as many as 16 machi-bugyō located throughout Japan, and there were always two in Edo.

Shogunal city
During this period, Edo ranked with the largest urban centers, some of which were designated as a  "shogunal city".  The number of such cities rose from three to eleven under Tokugawa administration.

In Edo, a special system was devised to mitigate the possibility of municipal corruption.  Initially, there were three machi-bugyō and then the number was reduced to one.  The number of machi-bugyō was increased to two under Shōgun Iemitsu.  Except for one brief period in the early 18th century, this bifurcated administration remained the consistent pattern until the shogunate was abolished in 1868.  There were two chief officials with equal powers and responsibilities; and each would alternately take control for one month before relinquishing the office to their counterpart.  These two officials were each based in a separate location at some distance from each other.  A reorganization of city government which focused greater attention on the two separate locations for these officials dates from 1719.    Kodenmachō (小伝馬町)

Kita-machi-bugyō

Minami-machi-bugyō
In 1707, the Tokugawa shogunate established the Minami-machi Bugyō-sho, the office of one of the magistrates of Edo, in this area of modern Yūrakuchō.
 Ōoka Tadasuke, Ōoka Echizen-no-kami Tadasuke

Honjo-machi-bugyō
A third machi-bugyō was deemed necessary in the years between 1702 through 1719.

List of Edo machi-bugyō

 Amano Saburobei Yasukage.
 Itakura Katsushige.
 Tōyama Kagemoto.
 Yoda Masatsugu (1753).
 Nanbu Toshimi (1753).

See also
 Bugyō

Notes

References
 Beasley, William G. (1955). Select Documents on Japanese Foreign Policy, 1853–1868. London: Oxford University Press; reprinted by RoutledgeCurzon, London, 2001.   (cloth)]
 Cullen, Louis M. (2003). A History of Japan, 1582-1941: Internal and External Worlds.] Cambridge: Cambridge University Press.  (cloth) --  (paper)
 Cunningham, Don. (2004).  Taiho-Jutsu: Law and Order in the Age of the Samurai. Tokyo: Tuttle Publishing.   (cloth)
 Hall, John Whitney. (1955). Tanuma Okitsugu, 1719–1788: Forerunner of Modern Japan. Cambridge: Harvard University Press.  OCLC 445621
 Jansen, Marius. (1995). Warrior Rule in Japan. New York: Cambridge University Press.  ;;  OCLC 31515317
 Naito, Akira, Kazuo Hozumi, and H. Mack Horto. (2003).  Edo: the City that Became Tokyo. Tokyo: Kodansha. 
 Nussbaum, Louis-Frédéric and Käthe Roth. (2005).  Japan encyclopedia. Cambridge: Harvard University Press. ;  OCLC 58053128
 Screech, Timon. (2006).   Secret Memoirs of the Shoguns: Isaac Titsingh and Japan, 1779–1822. London: RoutledgeCurzon. 	;   OCLC 65177072

Government of feudal Japan
Officials of the Tokugawa shogunate